The 2021–22 morning network television schedule for the five major English-language commercial broadcast networks in the United States covers the weekday and weekend morning hours from September 2021 to August 2022. The schedule is followed by a list per network of returning and cancelled shows from the 2020–21 season. The daytime schedules for the five major networks that offer morning programming are expected to remain consistent with the prior television season.

Affiliates fill time periods not occupied by network programs with local or syndicated programming. PBS – which offers daytime programming through a children's program block, PBS Kids – is not included, as its member television stations have local flexibility over most of their schedules and broadcast times for network shows may vary. Also not included are MyNetworkTV (as the programming service also does not offer daytime programs of any kind), and Ion Television (as its schedule is composed mainly of syndicated reruns).

Fox doesn’t provide network programming on weekday mornings, therefore are not included in the schedule, The CW however doesn’t provide network programming on weekday and Sunday mornings, therefore are not included in the schedule.  On Saturday mornings, all of the networks lease the time to outside producers to produce programming to fulfill E/I programming obligations as mandated by the FCC.

Legend

Schedule
New series are highlighted in bold.
All times correspond to U.S. Eastern and Pacific Time (select shows) scheduling (except for some live sports or events). Except where affiliates slot certain programs outside their network-dictated timeslots and The CW which airs its programming block at the same time in all time zones, subtract one hour for Central, Mountain, Pacific (for selected shows), Alaska, and Hawaii-Aleutian times.
Local schedules may differ, as affiliates have the option to pre-empt or delay network programs. Such scheduling may be limited to preemptions caused by local or national breaking news or weather coverage (which may force stations to tape delay certain programs in overnight timeslots or defer them to a co-operated station or digital subchannel in their regular timeslot) and any major sports events scheduled to air in a weekday timeslot (mainly during major holidays). Stations may air shows at other times at their preference.
All sporting events air live in all time zones in U.S. Eastern time, with local and/or afternoon programming after game completion.

Weekdays
{| class="wikitable sortable" style="width:100%;margin-right:0;font-size:90%;text-align:center"
|-
! colspan="2" style="background:#C0C0C0; width:1.5%; text-align:center;"|Network
! width="4%" style="background:#C0C0C0; text-align:center;"|7:00 a.m.
! width="4%" style="background:#C0C0C0; text-align:center;"|7:30 a.m.
! width="4%" style="background:#C0C0C0; text-align:center;"|8:00 a.m.
! width="4%" style="background:#C0C0C0; text-align:center;"|8:30 a.m.
! width="4%" style="background:#C0C0C0; text-align:center;"|9:00 a.m.
! width="4%" style="background:#C0C0C0; text-align:center;"|9:30 a.m.
! width="4%" style="background:#C0C0C0; text-align:center;"|10:00 a.m.
! width="4%" style="background:#C0C0C0; text-align:center;"|10:30 a.m.
! width="4%" style="background:#C0C0C0; text-align:center;"|11:00 a.m.
! width="4%" style="background:#C0C0C0; text-align:center;"|11:30 a.m.
|-
! colspan="2" style="background:#D3D3D3;"|ABC
| colspan="4" style="background: #6699CC;"|Good Morning America
| colspan="4" style="background:#abbfff;"|Local and/orsyndicated programming
| colspan="2" style="background:#ffff00;"|The View
|-
! colspan="2" style="background:#D3D3D3;"|CBS
| colspan="4" style="background: #6699CC;"|CBS Mornings
| colspan="2" style="background:#abbfff;"|Local and/orsyndicated programming
| colspan="2" style="background:#ffc0cb;|Let's Make a Deal| colspan="2" style="background:#ffc0cb;" |The Price Is Right
|-
! colspan="2" style="background:#D3D3D3;"|NBC
| colspan="4" style="background: #6699CC;" |Today
| colspan="2" style="background: #6699CC;" |Today Third Hour
| colspan="2" style="background: #6699CC;" |Today with Hoda & Jenna
| colspan="2" style="background:#abbfff;"|Local and/or syndicated programming
|}

Notes:
 Depending on their choice of feed, CBS stations have the option of airing Let's Make a Deal at either 10:00 a.m. or 3:00 p.m. Eastern (airtime adjusted by time zone)

Saturday 

Notes:
 To comply with FCC educational programming regulations, stations may defer certain programs featured in their respective network's E/I program blocks to determined weekend late morning or afternoon time periods if a sporting event is not scheduled in the timeslot or in place of paid programming that would otherwise be scheduled.
 Airtimes of sporting events and, on NBC, the Saturday edition of Today may vary depending on the offerings scheduled for that weekend. (Fox and/or NBC may air sports programming on Saturday mornings; NBC may preempt or abbreviate the length of Today to accommodate sports programming airing that day, forcing its stations to air some of the network's E/I-compliant programs in other open weekend time slots to fulfill educational content obligations.)

Sunday

Notes:
 Airtimes of sporting events may vary depending on the offerings scheduled for that weekend.

By network

ABC

Returning series:
ABC News
Good Morning America
This Week with George Stephanopoulos
Litton's Weekend Adventure / Weekend Adventure
Free Enterprise
Hearts of Heroes (shared with Go Time)
Oh Baby! with Anji Corley
Outback Adventures 
The View

New series:
Litton's Weekend Adventure / Weekend Adventure
Wildlife Nation with Jeff Corwin

Not returning from 2020–21:
Litton's Weekend Adventure
Ocean Treks with Jeff Corwin
Rock the Park (moved to Go Time)
Sea Rescue

CBS

Returning series:
CBS Dream Team
All In with Laila Ali 
The Henry Ford's Innovation Nation
Hope in the Wild
Lucky Dog
Mission Unstoppable
Pet Vet Dream Team
CBS News
CBS Sunday Morning
Face the Nation
Let's Make a Deal
The Price Is Right

New series:
CBS News
CBS Mornings
CBS Saturday Morning

Not returning from 2020–21:
CBS News
CBS This Morning
CBS This Morning Saturday

The CW

Returning series:
One Magnificent Morning
Jack Hanna's Into the Wild
Ready, Set, Pet 

New series:
One Magnificent Morning
The Open Road with Dr. Chris (moved from CBS Dream Team)

Not returning from 2020–21:
One Magnificent Morning
Jewels of the Natural World (moved to Go Time in First-run syndication)
Tails of Valor 
This Old House: Trade School

Fox

Returning series:
Fox News Sunday
Fox Sports
Big Noon Kickoff
Fox NFL Kickoff
Xploration Station
Xploration DIY Sci
Life 2.0 
Xploration Awesome Planet
Xploration Outer Space

New series:
Xploration Station
Sci Q
Second Chance Pets

Not returning from 2020–21:
Xploration Station
Xploration Nature Knows Best
Xploration Weird But True

NBC

Returning series:
The More You Know
Earth Odyssey With Dylan Dreyer
One Team: The Power of Sports
Vets Saving Pets
The Voyager with Josh Garcia 
Wild Child
NBC News
Meet the Press
Today
Today Third Hour
Today with Hoda & Jenna
Sunday Today with Willie Geist

Not returning from 2020–21:
The More You Know
A New Leaf
The Champion Within with Lauren Thompson

Notes

See also
2021–22 United States network television schedule (prime-time)
2021–22 United States network television schedule (afternoon)
2021–22 United States network television schedule (late night)
2021–22 United States network television schedule (overnight)

References

2021 in American television
2022 in American television
United States weekday network television schedules